Satyawati  is a village development committee in Palpa District in the Lumbini Zone of southern Nepal. At the time of the 1991 Nepal census it had a population of 3183 people.

References

Populated places in Palpa District